AU Ahmed Bangladesh Nationalist Party politician. He was elected a member of parliament from Bagerhat-3 in February 1996.

Career 
Prafulla Kumar Mandal was elected to parliament from Bagerhat-3 as a Bangladesh Nationalist Party candidate in 15 February 1996 Bangladeshi general election.

He was defeated from Bagerhat-3 constituency on 12 June 1996 on the nomination of Bangladesh Nationalist Party.

References 

Living people
People from Bagerhat District
Bangladesh Nationalist Party politicians
Year of birth missing (living people)
6th Jatiya Sangsad members